The Weakness of the Bolshevik is a 2003 Spanish psychological drama film directed by Manuel Martín Cuenca from a screenplay he co-wrote with Lorenzo Silva, based on Silva's novel La flaqueza del bolchevique.

Plot
In Madrid, a middle-aged man driving his car rams into the rear of another car that is driven by a woman named Sonsoles. They argue and then the frustrated businessman harasses her by sending lewd remarks on her phone. He stalks her and this eventually leads him to the school where her 15-year-old sister María studies. He follows her and introduces himself to her with a false name and profession. They start spending time together, going to a park and afterwards to the swimming complex. María later learns that the person she is seeing is named Pablo López. However, after an initial reluctance, she gives in and they again start to see each other. On the other hand, a colleague of Pablo is wooing him hard, but he disperses her advances as he has grown to have feelings for María. Meanwhile, Sonsoles's older lover fixes a device in her landline which traces unknown numbers and hence she knows that Pablo is behind the act. However, she does not know about her sister's involvement with him and so she sends goons after him to teach him a lesson. But when the goons target Pablo, María is with him, and she is molested by the goons. Pablo tries hard to save her, but he is captured, and when María tries to save herself by hitting one of the goons with her knee, she is thrown against a rock and dies on the spot. Pablo, overcome by sorrow and grief, stays by her until the police arrive and is arrested. In prison, he sees a flashback of María and becomes elated.

Cast

Production 
The film is a Rioja Audiovisual production. It was shot in Madrid.

Release 
Distributed by United International Pictures, the film was theatrically released in Spain on 31 October 2003.

Reception
Jonathan Holland of Variety considered the film to be a "superbly helmed and played parable of moral breakdown and recovery", "let down only by a weak conclusion".

Mirito Torreiro of Fotogramas gave the film 4 out of 5 stars, writing about the "effective, devastating and unquestionably moral" story, praising the discovery of the new talent María Valverde, whereas negatively assessing "a finale that deflates the earlier drama".

Accolades 

|-
| rowspan = "4" align = "center" | 2004 || rowspan = "2" | 18th Goya Awards || Best Adapted Screenplay || Manuel Martín Cuenca, Lorenzo Silva ||  || rowspan = "2" | 
|-
| Best New Actress || María Valverde || 
|-
| rowspan = "2" | 13th Actors and Actresses Union Awards || Best Film Actor in a Minor Role || Rubén Ochandiano ||  || rowspan = "2" | 
|-
| Best New Actress || María Valverde || 
|}

See also 
 List of Spanish films of 2003

References

External links
 
 

2003 films
2000s Spanish-language films
2000s psychological drama films
Films based on Spanish novels
Films scored by Roque Baños
Films set in Madrid
Films shot in Madrid
Spanish drama films
2000s Spanish films